FlyAway is an airport shuttle service which transports passengers non-stop to and from Los Angeles International Airport (LAX). Currently, service is offered between LAX and a bus terminal near Van Nuys Airport or Los Angeles Union Station. The FlyAway service is managed by Los Angeles World Airports (LAWA), which also operates LAX and Van Nuys Airport. Buses are owned and operated by third-party contractors. FlyAway is part of the LAWA ground transportation initiative to reduce traffic congestion and vehicle emissions pollutants by encouraging high-occupancy vehicle ridership.

FlyAway buses do not accept cash. Tickets may be purchased with a credit or debit card on board or online. Fares may also be paid with an Transit Access Pass (TAP) card. Tickets for the Union Station route can also be purchased at a Metrolink ticket vending machine located at all train stations, including Union Station. Metrolink monthly pass holders can ride the Union Station route for free with a same-day plane ticket.

Routes

Van Nuys/San Fernando Valley

This route travels between LAX and the FlyAway terminal building and parking structure located next to the LAWA-owned Van Nuys Airport. The Van Nuys FlyAway route provides services 24 hours a day, with buses departing every half-hour throughout much of the day (except every 15 minutes during peak hours and every hour late in the night).

Van Nuys is the only FlyAway location with a passenger terminal building (located at 7610 Woodley Ave), which opened on December 17, 2004. The US$34-million facility was designed to serve as a remote LAX terminal, and was designed with the ability to add airline ticketing and checked baggage services in the future.  The renovation also added a 2,000-car parking structure, more convenient passenger drop-off and new landscaping.  There is now a total of 3020 available parking spaces. The service is operated with 45-foot motorcoaches.

The Van Nuys FlyAway is the original route and was the only FlyAway service for more than 30 years after it was launched on July 10, 1975. During its first year of operation, it transported over 275,000 passengers. By 2008, Los Angeles World Airports reported the annual passenger count from its flagship location in the San Fernando Valley rose to nearly 988,000.

The Van Nuys FlyAway route is one of the few public transportation systems that operate at a profit. Fares and parking fees charged to customers generate enough revenue that LAWA predicted to have a net operating profit of approximately $168,000 in 2013.

Union Station

This route travels between LAX and the Patsaouras Transit Plaza on the east side of Union Station in downtown Los Angeles. It facilitates those who use public transportation to get to Union Station and then transfer to the bus to complete their journey. There is, however, a parking garage available for those who wish to drive to Union Station, though the rates are higher than at Van Nuys.

The Union Station FlyAway route operates 24 hours a day, with buses departing every half-hour throughout much of the day (except every 20 minutes during peak hours and every hour late in the night). The buses leave from Bay 1 at Union Station's Patsaouras Transit Plaza, and use the high-occupancy toll (HOT) lanes on the Harbor Freeway (I-110) and the carpool/high-occupancy vehicle (HOV) lanes on the Century Freeway (I-105). Tickets may be purchased from the staffed FlyAway kiosk at the Patsaouras Transit Plaza or at any Metrolink ticket vending machine.

The LAX FlyAway began offering service at Union Station on March 15, 2006, and has been hailed as a success by city officials since its inception. Union Station was the second FlyAway service location to open. During its first year of operation, the FlyAway at Union Station transported 250,000 passengers, more than three times the number predicted at the onset of service. By 2008, Los Angeles World Airports reported the annual passenger count rose to more than 433,000.

Former routes

Irvine 

The LAX FlyAway from Irvine operated from the Irvine Transportation Center. Service commenced on November 16, 2009, providing for a 60-minute or more journey between LAX and the Irvine Transportation Center. Following the Chapter 11 bankruptcy of Coach America, the operator of the route, service was terminated on August 31, 2012.

The Irvine Transportation Center provided access to Metrolink and Amtrak services and provided more convenient access to Central and Southern Orange County. The LAX FlyAway station was next to the tracks near the shuttle pick-up and drop-off area. LAX FlyAway passengers had access to free long-term overnight parking (500 spaces) in a lot next to the Irvine Transportation Center.

Unlike the frequent services of the other FlyAway routes, the Irvine route only ran six times a day, with buses two to four hours apart. The fare was also much higher at $25 for adults.

Expo/La Brea
This route traveled from the Expo/La Brea station on the Metro Expo Line to LAX. Service on the Expo/La Brea FlyAway route began on July 1, 2013, and offered bi-hourly service priced lower than other routes. The route was discontinued on September 2, 2014, due to low ridership.

Santa Monica
This route traveled between LAX and Santa Monica Place (2nd Street & Colorado Avenue).

The route ran once an hour between 5:45 am and 9:45 pm southbound and 6:45 am and 11:45 pm northbound with buses departing Santa Monica Place and LAX at 45 minutes past the hour.

Service on the Santa Monica FlyAway route began on July 15, 2014. There was no dedicated long-term FlyAway parking at the Santa Monica Place, although public pay parking is available nearby. The Santa Monica FlyAway route was intended for those who live in Santa Monica, those using the city's Big Blue Bus system, the nearby Metro Expo Line, and those being picked up or dropped off nearby. This service was discontinued as of 11:59pm, Monday September 5, 2016.

One of the reasons this route failed is there is already a Big Blue Bus route 3 along Lincoln Boulevard with service to LAX.

Orange Line
Starting on December 7, 2015, some trips on the Van Nuys FlyAway made an additional stop at the Woodley station on the Metro Orange Line (now G Line). The stop allowed San Fernando Valley residents to reach LAX without having to drive to the airport or to the existing Van Nuys terminal building.

Hourly service was offered at this stop between 4 am and 11 pm each day. Buses stopped at a dedicated bus bay on the south side of Victory Boulevard just east of Woodley Avenue. No parking was available.

Due to low ridership, the Orange Line FlyAway stop was discontinued on January 31, 2019.

Westwood

This route traveled between LAX and Parking Structure 32 south of the UCLA campus in Westwood.

The Westwood FlyAway route ran once an hour between 6 am and 10 pm southbound and 6 am and 11 pm northbound with buses departing UCLA and LAX at the top of every hour.

Drivers dropping off or picking up FlyAway passengers could enter and exit UCLA's Parking Structure 32 without paying a fee. Limited parking was also available (25 stalls in the structure are marked for the use of FlyAway passengers) for $12 per weekday, $8 per weekend day and $63 for any 7-day period.

The LAX FlyAway in Westwood began operating on June 14, 2007. The Westwood location was the third FlyAway route in the network of non-stop buses to LAX.

The Westwood route converted to smaller clean-fueled, compressed natural gas (CNG) buses in fall 2008. The buses mostly traveled on the congested Interstate 405 Freeway, so average travel time could have been 45 minutes or longer during peak traffic hours.

During its first year of operation the FlyAway at Westwood transported 105,300 passengers, nearly 10 percent more than the number predicted at the onset of service. The 2008 annual passenger count reported by Los Angeles World Airports was nearly 125,300.

The Westwood Flyaway route was discontinued on July 1, 2019. It had the lowest service rating of the FlyAway stops, citing the $12 daily parking fee at the UCLA parking lot closest to the stop and a preference for ride-sharing services.

Long Beach 

This route traveled between LAX and Shelter A at the Long Beach Transit Gallery in downtown Long Beach. The stop was near the Downtown Long Beach station on the Metro A Line, with dozens of Long Beach Transit bus routes stopping nearby.

The Long Beach FlyAway route ran once an hour between 5:30 am and 9:30 pm northbound and 5:30 am and 10:30 pm southbound with buses departing Hollywood and LAX at 30 minutes past the hour.

Service on the Long Beach FlyAway route began on December 30, 2015. There was no dedicated long-term FlyAway parking in Long Beach, although public pay parking is available nearby. The route was intended for those who live in or near Long Beach, those using transit, and those being picked up or dropped off nearby.

The Long Beach Flyaway route was suspended on March 28, 2020, at the start of the COVID-19 pandemic, with a 29% decrease in ridership in March 2020 compared to the previous year.

Hollywood
This route traveled between LAX and a stop located on Vine Street, just southwest of the Hollywood/Vine station on the Metro B Line.

The Hollywood FlyAway route ran once an hour between 5:15 am and 9:15 pm southbound and 6:15 am and 10:15 pm northbound with buses departing Hollywood and LAX at 15 minutes past the hour.

Service on the Hollywood FlyAway route began on September 3, 2014. There was no dedicated long-term FlyAway parking at the Hollywood/Vine station, although public pay parking is available nearby. The Hollywood FlyAway route was intended for those who live in or near Hollywood, those using the Metro B Line, or those being picked up or dropped off by a motorist at nearby metered parking or paid parking facilities.

Since its inception, over 75 complaints about the Hollywood FlyAway had been logged, ranging from buses arriving up to an hour late to not arriving at all. In December 2014, LAWA informed Corinthian Transportation, the contractor that supplies the service, that they expect greatly improved service immediately; however, the organization did not specify what punitive measures would be taken in the event service did not improve. Corinthian offered a plan in January 2015 to LAWA to improve the service, but it was rejected as inadequate. Corinthian claimed that they had increased the number of buses on the Hollywood route, but as of January 2015, the problems persisted.

The Hollywood Flyaway route was suspended on March 28, 2020, at the start of the COVID-19 pandemic, with a 29% decrease in ridership in March 2020 compared to the previous year. Although no official announcement was made, both the Long Beach and Hollywood FlyAway routes have been permanently discontinued.

References

External links
 Official Site - Flyaway Bus

Public transportation in Los Angeles County, California
Bus transportation in California
Transit authorities with natural gas buses
Los Angeles International Airport
Airport bus services